Payne's Creek National Park is a nature reserve in the Toledo District of southern Belize.  The park encompasses  of land including the dominant broadleaf forest as well as mangrove areas.

Natural history
This national park, which stretches along the lower reaches of the Monkey River, was previously disturbed by banana farming and slash-and-burn agricultural practices; however, in 2007 a verdant broadleaf secondary forest provides habitat for a diverse tropical flora and fauna.

Maya sites
At least four Maya sites have been discovered in Payne's Creek National Park to date. Included are a site now under water, with rare preserved wooden artifacts and portions of wooden buildings.

The excavations of submerged Mayan saltworks at the Payne's Creek National Park, dating back to 300–900 AD, highlight the usage of stone tools for cutting meat or fish, salting and preserving them within wooden kitchens, in order to be transported to inland markets.

Bibliography
Toledo Institute Payne's Creek National Park, Belize
Lumina Tech, "Hydrology and ecology of the Monkey River watershed, southern Belize", 2006

References

National parks of Belize
Toledo District
Nature conservation in Belize